Günther Vidreis (born 16 September 1961) is a retired Austrian football striker and later manager.

References

1961 births
Living people
Austrian footballers
FC St. Veit players
SK Sturm Graz players
FC Admira Wacker Mödling players
First Vienna FC players
Association football forwards
Austrian Football Bundesliga players
Austrian football managers